Rock Father is Papa John Creach's fifth solo album and his last with Buddah Records. The tracks are recorded with the band Midnight Sun, with the same lineup that played on I'm the Fiddle Man.

Track listing
"Travelin' On'" (Midnight Sun, Papa John Creach) – 3:40
"High Gear" (John Lewis Parker, Kevin Moore, Creach) – 5:08
"Ol' Man River" (Oscar Hammerstein, Jerome Kern) – 3:22
"Slow Groove" (Dick Monda) – 2:23
"J. V. and Me" (Arthur Freeman, Ed Martinez) – 3:20
"Straight Ahead" (Arthur Freeman, Ed Martinez) – 3:48
"I Like All Kinds of Music" (John Lewis Parker, Kevin Moore, Creach) – 3:43
"Brand New Day" (John Lewis Parker, Creach) – 3:18
"Jump Up, Gimme Some Dancing" (Dick Monda) – 2:35
"Orange Blossom Special" (Ervin T. Rouse) – 3:33

Personnel
Papa John Creach – electric violin, vocals
Mark Leon – drums, vocals
Kevin Moore – electric guitar, acoustic guitar, vocals
John Lewis Parker – piano, organ, clavinet, Arp odyssey, vocals
Holden Raphael – congas, percussion, bells, harps, vocals
Bryan Tilford – bass, vocals

Additional Personnel
Al Vescovo – steel guitar, banjo
Reid King – vocals, equipment
Arthur Freeman – Arp strings

Papa John Creach albums
Rock Father
Buddah Records albums